Highway 11 is a major north-south highway in Saskatchewan, Canada that connects the province's three largest cities: Regina, Saskatoon and Prince Albert. It is also known as the Louis Riel Trail (LRT) after the 19th century Métis leader. It runs from Highway 1 (Trans-Canada Highway) in Regina until Highway 2 south of Prince Albert. Historically the southern portion between Regina and Saskatoon was Provincial Highway 11, and followed the Dominion Survey lines on the square, and the northern portion between Saskatoon and Prince Albert was Provincial Highway 12.

From Regina to Saskatoon, Highway 11 is a four-lane divided highway except in the village of Chamberlain, where the road narrows to two lanes through the community, including its intersection with Highway 2 south to Moose Jaw. All intersections in this segment are at-grade except for two interchanges in the Lumsden valley and in Saskatoon. Highway 11 passes through Saskatoon, following Circle Drive, bypassing the downtown area with the completion of the southern leg of the freeway in 2015.

North of Saskatoon, the road continues as a four-lane divided highway past the communities of Warman, Osler, Hague, Rosthern and Duck Lake.

Route description

Regina and Sherwood No. 159

The route starts off in Regina, the capital of the province. Besides being the provincial capital, Regina is a cultural and commercial metropole for both southern Saskatchewan and adjacent areas in the neighbouring American states of North Dakota and Montana. Hwy 11 begins in a moist mixed grassland region known as the Regina Plain ecoregion. Evraz Regina, a North American steel company formerly known as IPSCO, is located in the Sherwood Industrial Park (SIP) north of Regina. The final chapter for the namesake of the Louis Riel Trail occurred in Regina. It was here that Métis leader Louis Riel was tried and hung on September 18, 1885 for treason. In the spring of 2008, Tourism, Parks, Culture and Sport Minister Christine Tell proclaimed in Duck Lake, that "the 125th commemoration, in 2010, of the 1885 Northwest Resistance is an excellent opportunity to tell the story of the prairie Métis and First Nations peoples' struggle with Government forces and how it has shaped Canada today." The length of the route is an asphalt concrete primary weight highway which is part of the national highway system (NHS)
 The Ministry of Highways and Infrastructure (SHS) South Central Planning Committee manages the construction and maintenance of the highway near Regina which handles approximately 11,000 vehicles per day (VPD) in the Average Annual Daily Traffic (AADT) count.

Highway 11 begins just southwest of Regina in the Rural Municipality of Sherwood No. 159, where the Regina Bypass meets the Trans-Canada Highway, and travels north along Regina's western boundary, briefly passing through Regina city limits. Prior to the completion of the Regina Bypass in October 2019, Highway 11 began at the junction of Victoria Avenue and Ring Road in the east end of the city, and shared a  concurrency with Highway 6, before branching northwest from Albert Street at Regina's northern boundary, passing Pasqua Street. As part of the Regina Bypass, the Highway 11 designation was moved to the new freeway, while the bypassed section of Highway 11 between Highway 6 (Albert Street) and the Regina Byass was redesignated as Highway 11A.

Lumsden No. 189
 Hwy 11 branches to the northwest from the Regina Bypass outside the city limits and then passes the junction of Hwy 734. A steep decline begins into the Qu'Appelle Valley meeting Hwy 20 and Lumsden at the lowest depression the bridge over the Qu'Appelle River. The village of Lumsden was created in 1890 in conjunction with the coming of the CNR. When Saskatchewan became a province the Local Improvement District was formed, becoming the Rural Municipality of Lumsden No. 189 in 1912. One of the many administrative concerns of the RM was road construction and maintenance. The Qu'Appelle Valley provides a scenic route as the LRT traverses the Qu'Appelle River. Lumsden Historical Museum, The town of Lumsden, located on the Qu'Appelle River is at the bottom of the valley. The AADT within the valley declines to over 7,000 VPD after Lumsden. The northern hill out of the Qu'appelle Valley meets the intersection of Hwy 54, which provides access to Regina Beach on Long Lake.(Last Mountain Lake). The Arm River Plain is well-suited to agricultural venture and doyote, red fox, and jack rabbit may be spotted. There are archaeological sites along the Arm River Valley including a bison kill site and also in this area Bigmouth Buffalo (Ictiobus cyprinellus) along with varieties of sedge are flora of special concern. The SHS Central Planning Transportation Committee manages the route from here to just south of Saskatoon.

Dufferin No. 190

The LRT continues west for another  before turning north west. The Hwy 642 intersection features the small hamlet of Bethune, Saskatchewan to the north and Hwy 354. A former picnic area north of Bethune closed in 2013 or 2014. In the Allan Hills is the village of Findlater with 49 residents on the south side of the LRT, and picnic site on the north. In  is the northbound turnoff for Hwy 2 to Prince Albert. This commences the  concurrency with Hwy 2 into the town of Chamberlain.

Sarnia No. 221
Chamberlain, a village of 108 residents is at the intersection of the LRT, Hwy 2 south to Moose Jaw, and Hwy 733. A Surveyor and Ox Cart created by Davidson welder, farmer and sculptor Don Wilkins was erected in Chamberlain. are two sculptures A large sculpture of the prairie flower Prairie Lilies is also erected at Chamberlain.

North of Chamberlain is a picnic stop area on the west side of the highway and in another  is an unincorporated area of Aylesbury. This hamlet commemorates the LRT history with an Ox and Red River Cart sculpture by Don Wilkins located southwest of the LRT near the town entrance. The Midlakes Community Coalition erected this statue in 1999. Near the highway turn off at Aylesbury is a cemetery located on a hill near Lake Alexander. The Piping Plover (Charadrius melodus circumcinctus) is an endangered species of this area. Residents are also enumerated in census Division No. 6.

Craik No. 222

Another  is the intersection of the LRT with Hwy 732. Hwy 732 is a paved road which travels through the Iskwao Creek Valley. In  is the intersection with Hwy 643 where Craik is nestled within the triangle made by these three highways, Hwy 643, Hwy 732 and Hwy 11.

The buffalo hunter with buffalo gun and Red River cart sculptures made by Don Wilkins, President of the LRT Association, are erected at Craik. "Red River Cart First used in the Red River area to bring in meat from the buffalo hunt, the Red River Cart was later used in freighting. Constructed entirely of wood and tied together with leather, these carts were extremely stable and would be drawn through mud and marsh, floated and carried loads of 500 to 1000 pounds." The Craik Sustainable Living Project (CSLP) Eco-Centre and “dugout house” a typical 19th century living quarters can be toured with Pelican Eco-Tours. The park features Arm Lake which is the reservoir created from damming the Squaw Valley Creek which used to run from the Qu'Appelle River in the Eyebrow Hills north east just south of Davidson. The Arm River Valley is visible north of Chamberlain and continues to run parallel to the LRT from Bethune to Craik. Craik and District Golf Course is a 9 hole green golf course 1/2 mile east of the LRT. Craik has been sponsoring development and education about “ecovillages”, sustainable housing development.

Arm River No. 252

"Spirit of the Plain This work is intended as a symbolic tribute to those peoples, native and non-native, past and present, who have found harmony under the prairie sky and achieved a calm rhythm with the natural forces of this great land..."

Davidson, a town of over 950 residents is the halfway point between Saskatoon and Regina. The giant coffee pot and coffee cup in Davidson were erected in 1996 offering hospitality and a cup of coffee at the halfway rest stop. The Métis Fiddler and Oxcart statue were erected at Davidson in tribute to the LRT designation and the history of the Métis. The Iskwao Creek begins near Davidson and winds south to the Qu'Appelle Valley west of Girvin and Craik. A large white house erected in 1904 by Arm River Farms north of Davidson and can be seen from the LRT. Davidson Campground and Swimming Pool are located within the town. This area is a part of the
Saskatoon—Biggar Economic Region and the Mid Sask Rural Economic Development Authority (REDA). Between the Qu'appelle Valley and the town of Dundurn on either side of Davidson, the AADT is approximately 5,000 VPD.

Willner No. 253
Townline Road which is south of Bladworth which is a village of 70 residents near the intersecting line between Willner and McCraney rural municipalities.

McCraney No. 282
Bonnington Springs Campground is located at Kenaston. Kenaston was originally named Bonnington Springs and is located at the intersection with Hwy 15. Kenaston, with the logo Blizzard Capital of Saskatchewan, features a large sculpture of a Snowman built in 1983, but not visible from the highway. Residents belong to SARM Division No. 5 and are enumerated in Census Division No. 11 which resulted in a population of about 250 Kenaston residents.

Rosedale No. 283

Hanley, a town of over 450, is located at the intersection of Hwy 764. Hanley erected in 2000, a stone monument honoring its historic Opera House. At the intersection with Indi Road is a marker in commemoration of Indi Siding. To the west of the road is Indi Lake, and to the east, Theressa Lake which has now become a portion of Blackstrap Lake.

Dundurn No. 314

Blackstrap Provincial Park, Blackstrap Lake and Mountain are two man made features to the east of Route 11 near Dundurn, Saskatchewan. The 1971 Canada Winter Games were hosted at this venue which sported ski run and ski jump. Blackstrap Provincial Park can be accessed by turning east onto Hwy 211. Wilson Museum can be seen on the outskirts of the town of Dundurn from the LRT. Dundurn is a town of approximately 650 which is located at the intersection of Hwy 211 and the AADT is around 6,000 VPD.
 The Bone Gatherer and horse and cart statues are visible from the LRT at Dundurn. Vast quantities of buffalo bones were gathered across the prairie in the last years of the 19th century. The bones were shipped by rail to be made into fertilizer. The huge herds of buffalo roaming the prairie were a thing of the past.
"Dundurn. Honoring the Past Striving for a bright future. Dundurn, located in the heartland of the great Northern Bison range was known to buffalo hunters as Round Prairie. Cree, Métis and Dakota Sioux chose the wooded hills of this historic land as a good place to stay. Cattle ranching was [sic] established here in 1886 and since then the growth and prosperity of our community has been, to a great extent, dependent on the agricultural sector. The horse drawn Red River car and Bone Picker are reminiscent of an era ending when the skeletal remains of approximately 2,000,000 buffalo were gathered in the vicinity of Dundurn and Hanley. The influx of homesteaders, beginning in 1903, marked a new chapter in our story of progress and continuity." The Strehlow Road intersection marks the old access road to the locality of Strehlow as well Haultain Road which is the next junction marks the old access road to the locality of Haultain. The former Haultain one room school house site is now located on the Canadian Forces Base Dundurn grounds.
Another  along the LRT is the intersection with Floral Road to the east marking the birthplace town of Gordie Howe, and Grasswood Road on the west is at a small commercial area. Between Grasswood and Saskatoon the AADT increases to over 8,000 VPD, and the remainder of the route is within the jurisdiction of the SHS North Central Transportation Planning Committee. The Saskatoon Plain section of the moist mixed grassland of dark brown soils is suitable for cereal grains, feed grains and forage crops.

Corman Park No. 344

Traveling through Saskatoon from Grasswood Road to the Hwy 16 turn off encompasses  and entails going around Saskatoon on Circle Drive.
Numerous attractions in Saskatoon, the largest city of Saskatchewan, include the Forestry Farm park and zoo, Remai Modern Art Gallery, and the Wanuskewin National Heritage Park. The cloverleaf interchange at Circle Drive in Saskatoon was one of the first two SK interchanges which opened in 1967. Highway 11 is signed in both directions around Circle Drive in Saskatoon. Continuing North, the highway passes several interchanges, including with 8th Street and College Drive/Highway 5. After crossing the South Saskatchewan River, Circle Drive becomes a surface arterial commercial-industrial roadway for approximately 1.5 km. The Western route, proceeding due west on the cloverleaf, passes interchanges with (from east to west) Preston Avenue and Clarence Avenue, before the route passes the Idylwyld Freeway exit (its previous alignment through downtown) and Highway 219,  then crossing the South Saskatchewan River, and coming to an interchange with Highways 7 and 14. The stretch from 11th Street to Avenue C along the west/northwest area of Circle Drive has interchanges interspersed with Seagull intersections at Clancy Drive, Laurier Drive, and Airport Drive. The  concurrency with the Yellowhead Highway begins at the diamond interchange with Idylwyld Drive in the north industrial. The end of this concurrency marks the beginning of the next  concurrency with Highway 12, before the LRT branches off from due north to a north-east direction of travel. 
At the intersection of Highway 784, and the former alignment of Highway 305 is the city of Warman with over 7,000 residents and the AADT is about 10,000 VPD. Turning west on Hwy 784 is the Clarkboro ferry route across the South Saskatchewan River. Approximately 2.4 km north of the former alignment is the new interchange for Highway 305, providing access to north Warman. 
a
The town of Osler has 926 residents and is located at the intersection with Hwy 393. The AADT north of Warman to Osler declines to approximately 7,700 VPD. A vintage car on a pole is a large roadside attraction which can be seen at Osler. A further 1.6 kilometres (1 mile) north on the LRT is the intersection of Hwy 394 providing alternate access to the town.

Rosthern No. 403
The town of Rosthern is situated at the next notable crossing, Hwy 312. Traffic has again declined with the greater distance from Saskatoon and Rosthern, with an average of 5,000 VPD between Osler and Hague, and about 4,500 VPD between Hague and Rosthern. Rosthern, a town of over 1300 people is located in the "valley of the converging branches of the North and South Saskatchewan Rivers." The South Saskatchewan and North Saskatchewan River provide two important fish habitats for the province of Saskatchewan. There are 32 species of fish in the South Saskatchewan, and 25 species in the North Saskatchewan.

The large roadside attraction of a wheat sheaf
is located to the east of town at the tourism office and is visible from the LRT. The Station Arts center has converted the historic CN Station into an art gallery and summer theater center and is located at Rosthern. This section of the LRT travels through the Waldheim Plain of the Aspen parkland prairie ecoregion which features fescue grasslands dotted with Aspen tree bluffs. Black loamy soil types are excellent for specialty crops as well as grain and cereals which makes agriculture the predominant economic industry. Seager Wheeler (1868–1961) was a famous farmer developing hardy wheat varieties for the Saskatchewan short growing season.
 Hwy 312 provides access to the Batoche National Historic Site which features the Caron house, St. Antoine de Padoue church and rectory. Batoche is where Louis Riel fought his final battles in the North-West Rebellion of 1885. The Métis adopted a river lot system for settlement near Batoche along the South Saskatchewan River. The coming of the surveyor marking the plains into square quarter sections disrupted the established way of life. The Métis were offered scrip between 1886 and 1902 as compensation for their loss of land. Scrip land entitlement comprised . The available lands were not along the original river valley, or near the original settlement, so many Métis sold their scrip for money. Fish Creek near Batoche was originally named Tourond's Coulee, Northwest Territories (NWT). The Battle of Fish Creek memorial is near Batoche, and St. Laurent de Grandin features the St. Laurent Shrine.

Duck Lake No. 463

Duck Lake is just south of the Hwy 212 intersection and Fort Carlton Provincial Historic Park is west of the LRT on Hwy 212. This historic fur trade center was also an integral part of the North West Resistance. Duck Lake along route 11 also re-tells the story of the North-West Rebellion in murals on town buildings. Duck Lake Regional Interpretive Center relates the history of first nations, Métis and an immigrant pioneer Society to the area. As well, Glen Scrimshaw Art Gallery provides a showing of local artist Glen Scrimshaw. After Duck Lake the average VPD again declines to just above 3,000 AADT. Traveling  along the LRT is MacDowall which is west of the LRT. A part of the Boreal transition of the Boreal Plain is evident as the landscape changes to a mix of agricultural activities and forested areas. The black and dark gray soils are very fertile for a wide variety of crops. Along with aspen, white spruce, tamarack and jack pine are evident. Deer, moose, elk along with the occasional black bear can be seen along the route in this area.

Prince Albert No. 461

It is another  of travel in a north east direction to arrive at the terminus of the LRT, the intersection with Saskatchewan Highway 2 where the approximate AADT increases near the city of Prince Albert to 6,000 VPD. The final stretches of the LRT is in the boreal Nisbet Forest. Trails through the forest are enjoyed by snowmobilers, cross-country skiers, horseback riders, hikers, and campers

History

Beginnings

The Qu’Appelle, Long Lake and Saskatchewan Railway came through between Regina and Prince Albert through Saskatoon as early as 1890 providing an early method of travel following the red river cart and trail days. 
Chamberlain and Aylesbury were first linked via a highway in 1929, before this date transportation between the two was by a variety of trails. The summer of 1929 also started another road leaving the Qu'Appelle River valley east. Construction required building up low spots with elevating graders and dump wagons operated by horses. The elevating grader was to till unbroken soil and turn it towards a conveyor which lifted the dirt into the dump wagons. This process used 8 horses pulling in the front, and another eight at the rear pushing. The fresno crew constructed the level areas. Ditches were constructed on a 7% grade and filled with field rock to help prevent erosion. One of the main problems constructing the highway was the heavy field stone knolls. This highway served until 1949 when it was upgraded.

"The upland collection area for the underground streams comes together on top of the valley near Chamberlain. Highway construction surveyors had to curve the right-of-way to avoid this area. Another interesting diversion that the highway surveyors had to make, at the insistence of local residents, was to go around a large stone that had a metal marker spike in it, likely set up and recorded by early explorers. This site is now marked on the LRT with a large silhouette buffalo statue made by Don Wilkins."

A large white house erected in 1904 by Wells family north of Davidson and can be seen from the LRT. The Wells family came north from Chicago and started The Wells Land & Cattle Co. becoming land agents for settlers from the agents. The Wells Land & Cattle Co. purchased land around Davidson, Arm River and Qu'Appelle River for homestead settlement.

In 1971, the Department of Highways was moved from Hawarden to Kenaston closer to the main Highway, which was Hwy 11. Hanley erected in 2000, a stone monument honoring its historic Opera House. The 1924 Hanley Opera House was a center of cultural activity in the area. The Opera House featured Mary Pickford, Harry Lauder, Boris Karloff and the Chatauqua performers to name a few between its inception and 1967 when the new Centennial Hall was used for performances. The original Opera House was demolished in the 1980s as it was unsafe.

Roads were provided and maintained through a committee formed in 1907 by Local Improvement District 15.B.3 around Hanley. The early challenges were the hilly area and creek to the east. Early prairie roads were trails which became so rutted that they could barely be crossed over. To make roads out of these trails horse drawn blade graders were used to level out hummocks and fill badger holes. Horse drawn slush scrapers filled in sloughs. More advanced fresno scrapers replaced the slush scrapers as they could make longer and wider swaths across the sloughs. By ploughing the prairie soil at the road allowance, and then using road graders to pull in the dirt roads could be made wide enough for the first cars of the area. The rural municipality of Rosedale No. 283 was incorporated December 13, 1909.

Winter trails in the horse and buggy days would have two tracks across the prairie several feet higher than the prairie sod due to the snow built up on them. Summer raised roads were built up by using two horse scrapers digging an area alongside the highway, then using the loose dirt to widen the highway. Sixteen and twenty four horses were often needed to pull the graders, and several drivers were required. Any work done by a farmer would reduce his payment in taxes.

The 1926 highway map of Saskatchewan marks the route of Provincial Highway 11 following along the CNR line using township and range roads, so travel is in lines straight north, changing direction to west travel at 90 degree angles from Regina through to Saskatoon. Only Provincial Highway 12 is marked in the same fashion between Saskatoon and Prince Albert on the 1926 highway map of Saskatchewan, which has formed the base of the northern section of the LRT. (The current Saskatchewan Highway 12 travels between Saskatoon and Shell Lake.)

As tractors replaced horses in the field and motorized vehicles replaced horses on the road, an increasing need arose to replace the early dirt trails with graded gravel highways. In the early 1930s, the gravel highway constructed between Chamberlain and Aylesbury in 1929 was further extended to Dundurn to meet this need. Shortly thereafter, the graveled highway extended between Saskatoon and Regina.

Later history
As the Annual Average Daily Traffic (AADT) increased, the need for wider, all-weather, paved roads became increasingly apparent. As early as the 1930s, various Saskatchewan cities, towns, and rural municipalities lobbied the provincial government to develop hard surfaced roads, including Highway 11, to connect its major centers, particularly Regina, Saskatoon, Prince Albert and Moose Jaw. Saskatoon mayor R.M. Pinder argued that Highway 11 should receive priority because "it serves the greatest number of people for the longest period of time" and its hard surfacing would facilitate the travel of American tourists to Prince Albert National Park and support transport operations to and from the Dundurn Military Camp. A dispute flared up between Saskatoon and Prince Albert community organizations over whether Highway 11 or Highway 2 should be paved first. Prince Albert advocated prioritizing Highway 2 as a more direct route between the northern and southern parts of the province and a more attractive route for American tourists driving to Prince Albert National Park. Saskatoon preferred Highway 11 because the alternative would bypass it and not provide as many Saskatchewan residents the transportation benefits of direct access to a paved highway. In 1950, the provincial government indicated that it would prioritize the paving of Highway 11 between Saskatoon and Regina; by October 1952 this section was completely paved.
The improved highway was also rerouted in some places, including the section between Bladworth and Dundurn which was completely rebuilt, and bypasses were built around some towns and villages through which it had formerly passed. Although the highway's route had not entirely reached its present contours, it was made straighter; the distance traversed between Saskatoon and Regina was reduced by 27 miles. It more closely followed the CNR tracks and contained fewer right angle corners than it had in 1926. The highway between Saskatoon and Prince Albert received less attention during this period; a 1956 highway map shows that it was still almost entirely gravel.

Following the completion of the Trans Canada Highway, federal funds became available for provincial highway projects. Highway 11 was considered an important transportation route from a national perspective, and therefore received funding under the National Highways Project. The highway between Saskatoon and Rosthern was partially paved and the remainder was oiled to create a dust-free all-weather surface, and in 1964, the last remaining gravel section of the highway, between Rosthern and its junction with Highway 2, was oiled. In the latter half of the 1960s, many sections of the highway between Regina and Saskatoon were reconstructed and given wide shoulders; previously some segments had no shoulders. During the same period, the Saskatoon to Prince Albert portion was rebuilt to "Trans-Canada standards" and extensively re-routed to follow the same course as the CNR tracks which shortened the travel distance between the two cities by 13 miles. A new route was constructed to connect Saskatoon and Rosthern via Warman and Hague. Once this phase of construction was complete, the Rosthern to Prince Albert segment was upgraded and fully paved, and the segment between MacDowall and Prince Albert was re-routed along a straighter course.

In 1960, the section between Regina and Lumsden was the first to be converted to a four lane twinned highway. Twinning the rest of highway between Saskatoon and Regina commenced in 1968 with the conversion of the segment between Saskatoon and Dundurn. Work gradually progressed until the final section between Craik to a point just north of Davidson was twinned in late 1978. With the exception of a three-kilometre, two-lane segment through Chamberlain, the newly constructed four lane sections of the highway bypassed all the towns and villages between Saskatoon and Regina. An initiative to twin the highway between Saskatoon and Prince Albert was launched in the first decade of the 21st century. In 2006, Provincial Highways and Transportation Minister Eldon Lautermilch stated that "twinning will improve the province's busiest highways to support tourism and economic development, and move our export goods to market efficiently across inter-provincial borders." Sections of highway nearest to Saskatoon were twinned first; with the paving of newly constructed lanes along a 13-kilometre stretch between Prince Albert and MacDowall, the project was completed on 25 October 2013.

On June 20, 2001 the entire length of Hwy 11 was re-named the Louis Riel Trail (LRT) at a ceremony which took place at the Duck Lake Regional Interpretive Centre. The LRT connects major sites of the 1885 North-West Rebellion. Mid-Lakes Community coalition, Saskatchewan Highway 11 communities and municipalities, the Saskatchewan Métis Nation, and the Saskatchewan History and Folk Lore Society approached Highways and Transportation Minister Pat Atkinson about the designation. Saskatchewan Highway 11 is the actual course followed by the RCMP and Louis Riel to arrive at Regina for the trial of Louis Riel. The LRT sign features a red river cart featured in yellow on a blue background.

In 2008, Pinkie Road was a proposed as 4 lane twinned highway connector road linking two National Highway System routes as a part of the Asia-Pacific Gateway and Corridor Initiative (APGCI), linking Hwy 1, the Trans Canada Highway and Hwy 11. This route was expended to continue east and bypass southern and eastern Regina, connecting with Hwy 1 east of the city. The Regina Bypass was opened in October 2019 with Hwy 11 being designated to the western leg of the route, while a  bypassed section of Hwy 11 became Hwy 11A.

Maintenance

Tenders for construction work on Highway 11 in 2008 amounted to $63.3 million of which $30 million saw  twinned between Prince Albert and Saskatoon. Among the upcoming projects which have received approval were the
The first project was scheduled for completion by October 2008.

The approval for the $680,000 tender was awarded by Highways and Transportation Minister Mark Wartman.

Earlier maintenance included $897,000 for paving of  near Hanley for a project cost of $897,000. Highways and Transportation Minister Judy Bradley awarded contracts for work in 1999.

The first asphalt rubber project occurred July 2007 on Saskatchewan Highway 11. Close to  near Davidson show the rubberized asphalt road surface on the right lane at a cost of $126,800. The next rubberized asphalt project in the summer of 2007, was  through the town of Chamberlain. The $1.4 million spent here included the rubberized asphalt pavement surface, curbs and catch basins.

"The mining, exploration, and oil and gas sectors across northern Saskatchewan funnel thousands of heavy trucks through Prince Albert on a daily basis. Improving this vital gateway will not only make travel safer and far more efficient for commercial traffic, but it will enhance the drive for thousand of visitors who head north each year to take advantage of our northern lakes"

Major intersections
From south to north:

References

External links

: Louis Riel Trail official website
Google Maps: Highway 11 through Regina, Saskatchewan, Prince Albert
 Unofficial Saskatchewan Highways website
Batoche Photographs
Saskatchewan Road Map Travel Guide:#11 Highway 11
Mid-Lakes Community Coalition Home Page - Saskatchewan
Saskatchewan Highway 11 pictures
Welcome to the Duck Lake Regional Interpretive Centre!
Three Rivers Trail Association

011
011
Roads in Regina, Saskatchewan
Streets in Saskatoon